Timur Bolat (born 14 May 1989 in Ulaanbaatar, Mongolia) is a Mongolian-born Kazakhstani judoka. He competed at the 2012 Summer Olympics in the -90 kg event and lost his second match to Masashi Nishiyama. Bolat won the bronze medal at the 2009 and 2011 Asian Judo Championships.

References

External links
 
 
 

1989 births
Living people
Kazakhstani male judoka
Olympic judoka of Kazakhstan
Judoka at the 2012 Summer Olympics
Sportspeople from Ulaanbaatar
Asian Games medalists in judo
Judoka at the 2010 Asian Games
Judoka at the 2014 Asian Games
Asian Games silver medalists for Kazakhstan
Medalists at the 2014 Asian Games